Nagarvalam is a 2017 Indian Tamil-language drama film written and directed by Markx. The film stars Yuthan Balaji and Deekshitha Manikkam, while Yogi Babu, Bala Saravanan, and Namo Narayana play supporting roles. The film had a theatrical release on 21 April 2017.

Plot
Nagarvalam is the love story between two youngsters and an unexpected murder that shattered their dreams.

Cast
Yuthan Balaji as Kumar
Deekshitha Manikkam as Janani
Yogi Babu as Tamil teacher
Bala Saravanan as Kumar's friend
Namo Narayana
Anjathe Sridhar
G. Marimuthu as Janani's father
Vettai Muthukumar as Janani's brother
T. Ravi
Pasupathy in a guest appearance in the song "Isthukunu Irukuthu"

Soundtrack
Soundtrack was composed by Pavan Karthik.
"Kannala Kallu" - Yogisekar, Saaviyaa 
"Isthukunu" - Deva, Chinna Ponnu 
"Dinusaa Thaan" - Rocky, Saaviyaa 
"Anthangura" - Yogisekar, Saaviyaa 
"Paathu Poda" - Yogisekar, Gaana Vinoth

Release
The film opened on 21 April 2017 to mixed reviews from critics. The Hindu wrote "The film is mildly reminiscent of Balaji Sakthivel's Kaadhal (2004) that handled similar themes with more finesse and vision. Nagarvalam, though, ends up being such an over-long bus journey — you would rather hop off the bus and take an autorickshaw than sit through all its stops." The Times of India wrote "The film needed more such tense moments than ones like the forced drama that we get at the interval point."

References

External links
 

2010s Tamil-language films
2017 films
2017 romantic drama films
2017 directorial debut films
Indian romantic drama films